Marie Hamsun (born Marie Andersen) (19 November 1881 – 4 August 1969) was a Norwegian actress and writer.

Biography
Marie Andersen was born in Elverum, Hedmark, Norway. She was the eldest child in an affluent family. In 1897 the family moved to Christiania, where her father was involved in the property trade for twenty years until he bought the farm in Åneby in Nittedal.  She attended Ragna Nielsen's private school, where in 1901 she took final exams. Then she worked for three years as a governess and teacher. The Norwegian actor Society headed by Dore Lavik took her in as an actress. In the following years she toured around in Norway, until she was hired as a student at the National Theatre in 1907. In 1909, she became the second wife of the noted author, Knut Hamsun, with whom she had four children, sons Tore and Arild and daughters Eleanor and Cecilia.

She wrote two collections of poems and several children's books. Hamsun's work has been translated to several other languages, including Swedish, German, English, Latvian, Finnish and Dutch. She also published two biographies about her life with Knut Hamsun: Regnbuen (The Rainbow) (1953) and Under gullregnen (1959).

Marie Hamsun shared her husband's political views, and her support for the Third Reich and the German occupation forces during World War II exceeded that of her husband. She was a member of Vidkun Quisling's Nazi party Nasjonal Samling, and she frequently toured German cities reciting the works of Knut Hamsun during the early years of the war. In 1947, she was sentenced to three years of hard labor for treason, but due to a general amnesty she was jailed for only 9 months.

References

1881 births
1969 deaths
People from Elverum
Norwegian writers
Members of Nasjonal Samling
Norwegian women writers
People convicted of treason for Nazi Germany against Norway
Norwegian prisoners and detainees
Marie
Norwegian women in World War II